Saṛbanī or Sarban Confedracy is a tribal group of Pashtuns. They are situated in Pakistan and Afghanistan. The Sarbani include many Pashtun tribes, including Sherani,  Tareen, Durrani, Khalil, Kheshgi,Kasi which includes Mohmand and Shinwari, Daudzai, Muhammadzai, Chamkani, Yousafzai,   Tarkalani. According to the Pashtun legend of origins, the members of the Sarbani group all descend from Sarban, said to be the first son of the legendary founding father of the Pashtun people, Qais Abdur Rashid.

History
The origin of the Sarbani, might be connected with Hephthalites, who had a large nomadic confederation that included present-day Afghanistan and Pakistan in the 5th-6th centuries AD, as well as with Scythians, who are known to have settled where most of Pashtuns live today.

The Durrani Empire that existed in the 18th-19th centuries and that was centered in the territory of present-day Afghanistan and Pakistan  was founded by the Ahmad Shah Durrani, a Pashtun military commander under Nader Shah of Persia and chief of the Abdali Sarban tribe. Since that time, the Abdali tribe is known as Durrani.

Geographic distribution

Afghanistan
In Afghanistan, Sarbani mainly inhabit the provinces of Kandahar, Zabul, Uruzgan, Helmand, Nimroz, Farah, Herat, Badghis, Balkh, and Kunduz, as well as the provinces Nangarhar and Kunar in the eastern part of the country.

Pakistan
In Pakistan, Sarbani are living throughout the city of Peshawar, northern and eastern parts of Khyber Pakhtunkhwa and the Federally Administered Tribal Areas regions.  Additional large settlements are found in Multan, Quetta,  KPK, Mansehra, Abbottabad, Haripur and in the northern parts of Balochistan.

Sarbani tribes
Abubakar Siddique writes that "Under the prevailing classifications, Pashtuns are divided into four main tribal groupings: the Sarbani, Bettani, Ghurghust and Karlani... The Sarbanis are divided into two branches: the Sharkbun and the Kharshbun. The most significant tribes of this branch today are the Yusufzai, Sherani, Tareen, Urmer, Durranis, Khalils, Mohmands, Daudzai, Chamkanis, Shinwari and Tarkalani."

See also
 Pashtun tribes
 Pashtunistan

References

 External links
Map showing areas inhabited by Sarbani in Afghanistan and Pakistan
Pashtun tribes